The Women's marathon at the 2011 World Championships in Athletics was held starting and finishing at Gukchae – bosang Memorial Park on 27 August. A total of 54 runners began the race and twenty three nations were represented.

The fastest entrant that year was Edna Kiplagat of Kenya, who had won the 2010 New York Marathon and finished third in London in April. Her compatriot Priscah Jeptoo (2011 Paris champion) and Aselefech Mergia of Ethiopia (winner in Dubai) completed the three fastest athletes to start the race.  Other fast Ethiopian and Kenyan entrants included Sharon Cherop, Bezunesh Bekele and Atsede Baysa. The 2009 runner-up Yoshimi Ozaki headed the Japanese team. Other major participants were Sweden's Isabella Andersson and Chinese duo Zhou Chunxiu and Zhu Xiaolin. The reigning champion Bai Xue was absent, as were the 2008 Olympic champion Constantina Diṭă-Tomescu and the two fastest runners that year (Mary Keitany and Liliya Shobukhova).

A large group of 19 runners remained in the leading pack after 30 km, but a Kenyan trio of Kiplagat, Jeptoo and Cherop pulled away from the group after this point. With some 5 km to go, Kiplagat and Cherop collided at the drinks station. Kiplagat fell to the ground. Cherop slowed down and waited for her teammate until they both resumed running. It was Kiplagat who went on to take the gold medal for Kenya (the first medal of the championships), while Jeptoo and Cherop finished in second and third. This was the first time that any country had won all the medals in a marathon at either the World Championships or the Olympic Games. Bezunesh Bekele crossed the line for fourth place seven seconds later and Japan's Yukiko Akaba completed the top five.

The competition also served as the IAAF World Marathon Cup team race, which was decided by totalling the times of each nation's three fastest runners. The Kenyan women easily won the title, while China and Ethiopia were the silver and bronze medallists, respectively. This result represented the first time that the Japanese women had failed to win a team medal, since the competition was incorporated at the 1997 World Championships.

Medalists

Records
Prior to the competition, the records were as follows:

Qualification standards

Schedule

Results

Final

See also
2011 World Marathon Cup

References

External links
Marathon results at IAAF website

Marathon
Marathons at the World Athletics Championships
World Championships
Women's marathons
2011 in women's athletics
Marathons in South Korea